The 2019 ASUN Conference baseball tournament was held at Melching Field at Conrad Park, home field of the Stetson Hatters baseball team in DeLand, Florida, from May 22 through 25.  The winner of the tournament, Liberty, claimed the ASUN Conference's automatic bid to the 2019 NCAA Division I baseball tournament.

Format and seeding
The 2019 tournament was a double-elimination tournament in which the top six conference members participated.  Seeds were determined based on conference winning percentage from the round-robin regular season.

Bracket and results

Conference championship

References

ASUN Conference Baseball Tournament
Tournament
ASUN Conference baseball tournament
ASUN baseball tournament
Baseball competitions in Florida
College sports tournaments in Florida